Mrs. Kirsty M. Brown of Australia served as the Chairman of the World Program Committee and World Adult Resources Committee and as a member of the Educational Methods Group the World Scout Committee, Chief Commissioner of Scouts Queensland, and as Vice-Chairman of the Asia-Pacific Scout Committee. Currently (2017) Kirsty is Immediate Past Chief Commissioner and Life Member of Scouts Queensland, Life Member of Scouts Australia, Consultant to the Asia Pacific Regional Scout Committee and Chairman of the World Honours and Awards Committee?

Brown was initially a specialist in the Cub Scout Section of Scouts Australia. Since 2001, she has been an assistant commissioner in Queensland, where she focused on Youth Program, Adult Training, Adults in Scouting and Adventurous Activities. She served as Chief Commissioner 2012-2016.

In 2007, Brown was awarded the 312th Bronze Wolf, the only distinction of the World Organization of the Scout Movement, awarded by the World Scout Committee for exceptional services to world Scouting.

References

External links

complete list

Recipients of the Bronze Wolf Award
Year of birth missing
Scouting and Guiding in Australia